The 29th Asian Baseball Championship was the international baseball competition for Asian men's national teams. It was held in Taichung and Yunlin, Taiwan, on October 14 to 20, 2019. Chinese Taipei and China, the top two finishers, excluding Japan, qualified to compete in the Olympic Final Qualifying Tournament which will take place in March or April 2020.

Qualified teams
 – Host
  
  
  
  
 - 2018 East Asia Cup winner
 - 2018 West Asia Cup finalist
 - 2018 West Asia Cup finalist

Group stage

The first stage consisted of each team playing against each other team in its group once.

Group A

|}

Group B

|}

Super round and Consolation

Consolation

|}

Super round

|}

Bronze medal game

|}

Gold medal game

|}

Final standing

See also
 List of sporting events in Taiwan

References

Asian Baseball Championship
2019
2019 in Taiwanese sport
Asian Baseball Championship
Sport in Taichung
Yunlin County